This is a list of German sail frigates:

Mohrian (ex-Swedish)
Kurprinz
Deutschland 36
Eckernförde 48 (ex-Danish Gefion, captured 1849) - BU 1891
Thetis (ex-British (c. 1846), purchased 1855) - BU 1895
Niobe (ex-British, purchased 1862)

Frigates, sail
Germany, sail